John Wawrzynek is Professor of Electrical Engineering and Computer Science at the University of California at Berkeley. He holds a joint appointment with Lawrence Berkeley National Laboratory and is the Chief Faculty Director of the Berkeley Wireless Research Center. He is currently a principal researcher in multiple large research centers at UC Berkeley including Algorithms and Specializers for Provably Optimal Implementations with Resilience and Efficiency (ASPIRE), the  Parallel Computing Laboratory (ParLab), and the TerraSwarm Research Center.

References

External links
 John Wawrzynek's Berkeley EECS webpage

American computer scientists
California Institute of Technology alumni
Lawrence Berkeley National Laboratory people
Living people
University at Buffalo alumni
UC Berkeley College of Engineering faculty
Grainger College of Engineering alumni
Year of birth missing (living people)